The 1949–50 season was the fourth season in FK Partizan's existence. This article shows player statistics and matches that the club played during the 1949–50 season.

Players
First 11
Šoštarić, Kolaković, Čolić, Čajkovski, Jovanović, Jakovetić, Mihajlović, Pajević, Valok, Bobek, Atanacković

Other players
Grčević, Petrović, Drenovac, Lazarević, Senčar, Simonovski, Požega, Marjanović, Radunović, Racić, Vorgić, Hočevar, Bogojevac, Krajišnik, Šijaković, Stipić, Stanković, Popović i Kantardžić.

Friendlies

Competitions

Yugoslav First League

Yugoslav Cup

See also
 List of FK Partizan seasons

References

External links
 Official website
 Partizanopedia 1950  (in Serbian)

FK Partizan seasons
Partizan